Yuri Alekseyevich Drozdov (born 16 January 1972) is a Russian association football coach and a former player who spent most of his playing career at FC Lokomotiv Moscow. He is the manager of Sakhalinets Moscow.

Career
Before Lokomotiv, Drozdov used to play for their city rivals FC Dynamo Moscow. Since leaving Lokomotiv in 2003, Drozdov has had short spells at FC Alania Vladikavkaz and FC Zhenis Astana, before joining the Russian First Division side FC Khimki, helping the club to promotion to the Russian Premier League in 2006.

International
He was part of the USSR U-20 football team, which finished third in 1991 FIFA World Youth Championship.

Personal life
He is the father of footballers Nikita Drozdov and Ilya Drozdov.

External links
 

1972 births
Living people
Soviet footballers
Soviet Union youth international footballers
Soviet Union under-21 international footballers
Russian footballers
Russia international footballers
Russia under-21 international footballers
Russian expatriate footballers
Expatriate footballers in Kazakhstan
FC Lokomotiv Moscow players
FC Spartak Vladikavkaz players
FC Dynamo Moscow players
FC Zhenis Astana players
FC Khimki players
Russian Premier League players
Russian expatriate sportspeople in Kazakhstan
Russian football managers
FC Vityaz Podolsk players
Association football defenders
Association football midfielders
FC FShM Torpedo Moscow players
FC Mashuk-KMV Pyatigorsk players
People from Pyatigorsk
Sportspeople from Stavropol Krai